Chouani is a village on the island of Grande Comore in the Comoros. According to the 1991 census, the village had a population of 1723.

References 

Populated places in Grande Comore